Christian Schebitz (born 9 November 1962) is a West German bobsledder who competed in the late 1980s and early 1990s. He is also known for Bobsleigh World Cup two-man championship victory in 1989-90.

References
List of combined men's bobsleigh World Cup champions: 1985-2007
List of two-man bobsleigh World Cup champions since 1985

German male bobsledders
Living people
1962 births